The Stray Cat  (Spanish title: La Gata) is a Mexican telenovela produced by Nathalie Lartilleux for Televisa. It is a remake of the Venezuelan telenovela La Gata, produced in 1968 and Mexican telenovela Rosa Salvaje produced in 1987.

Maite Perroni and Daniel Arenas star as the protagonists, with Erika Buenfil as the adult protagonist, while Jorge Poza, Mónika Sánchez and first actress Laura Zapata star as the antagonists.

Plot 

The story takes place in the outskirts of Mexico City in Bordo de Xochiaca (a landfill), where a girl Esmeralda 12 years old who is always "disheveled and dirty" like a "Stray Cat" (una "Gata"). Esmeralda is a young neighborhood girl who grew up without her parents and learned to be happy with what little she had. She was raised from childhood by an elderly woman named Mrs. Rita who exploited her by making her go ask alms, sell candy and newspapers. Esmeralda could neither read nor write. She meets Pablo Martínez Negrete, a high society rich boy who teaches her to read and write and with whom she becomes friends. Since then Esmeralda notices that he is the first person to call her by her name and the first person who really truly cares about her. But Pablo's mother opposes his friendship with "The Stray Cat".

Several years later, Esmeralda grows up and becomes a beautiful young woman who still does not read nor write and has not changed since childhood. Pablo realizes that his feelings for The Stray Cat are more than that of a friend and feels confused as to what he feels for Esmeralda. Esmeralda starts looking for work, thanks to Pablo, as she does not want to keep asking alms and she does not want him to give her money. Lorenza, Pablo's mother, strongly opposes the friendship between Pablo and Esmeralda and alienates her from him. Pablo is pushed to fall in love with Mónica a girl who comes from "a good social position" and is also his "cousin".

Agustín, Pablo's father, convinces Pablo that he should study his masters abroad and marry Monica once he returns, a plot to separate him and Esmeralda. Pablo and Esmeralda decide to marry secretly before he goes abroad. From New York Pablo emails his father Agustín and asks him to help him fix travel papers for Esmeralda so she can reunite with him in New York. Pablo's father pretends to want to help him but has no interest in helping his son. Instead he plans to have Esmeralda kidnapped. Two men walk into Mrs. Rita's hut where they find Esmeralda alone, there the two men grab her and carry her out wrapped in blanklet and throw Esmeralda into the trunk of a stolen car. Esmeralda's friend Damián is going to her hut when he notices that one of the men is carrying something. Damián calls and whistles to his friends.  They drive away but are soon closed in by the carriage. Garabato tells them that if they mess with one of them they mess with all of them. Garabato and the gang scare of the men and force open the trunk and find Esmeralda wrapped in the blanket.

After several months Esmeralda gives birth to twins, a boy and a girl. Doña Rita who has always sought to benefit from "La Gata" forces her to marry Domenico "El Italiano" Almontem. Esmeralda having no other solution agrees to marry him only to purchase medicine for her daughter Leticia who is sick.

Fernando "El Silencioso" gets out of jail and vows to take revenge on those who locked him up injustly for using self-defense. Esmeralda later meets "El Silencioso", her biological father. She ignores her true origin. He takes her into his house and promises her that he wants to be a father to her and a grandfather to her children. Pablo returns from abroad to marry Mónica believing Esmeralda had betrayed him. He believes that the twins are not his and that she has a relationship with El Silencioso. Esmeralda becomes a beautiful well-educated woman and is determined to fight for his love. The Stray Cat will have to use her strong character to get the love of Pablo back.

Cast

Main 
 Maite Perroni as Esmeralda / La Gata
 Daniel Arenas as Pablo Martínez Negrete
 Laura Zapata as Lorenza de Martínez Negrete
 Erika Buenfil as Blanca Rafaela de la Santa Cruz
 Manuel Ojeda as El Silencioso

Secondary 

 Mónika Sánchez as Gisela Sinfuegos
 Pilar Pellicer as Doña Rita Olea Pérez
 Jorge Poza as Mariano Martínez Negrete
 Leticia Perdigón as Leticia "La Jarocha"
 Juan Verduzco as Agustín Martínez Negrete
 Lupita Lara as Eugenia Castañeda
 Socorro Bonilla as Mercedes "Doña Meche" Reyes
 Carlos Bonavides as Doménico "El Italiano" Almonte
 Ianis Guerrero as Damián Reyes
 Mariluz Bermúdez as Virginia Martínez Negrete
 Pierre Louis as Carlos "El Centavito"
 Óscar Ferreti as Don Lupe
 Teo Tapia AS Roberto Elizalde
 Alejandra Robles Gil as Inés Olea Pérez
 Jorge Alberto Bolaños as Omar
 Benjamín Rivero as Jesús Olea Pérez "Tílico" / Juan Garza
 Ruth Rosas as Dorita
 Ricardo Baranda as Garabato / Víctor de la Fuente
 Jorge Ortín as Osorio
 Antonio Medellín as Director de Cárcel
 Susana Lozano as Unknown Character
 Anic Moss as Alicia
 Patricia Maqueo as Child Esmeralda
 José Eduardo Álvarez as Child Pablo
 Ana Sofía Durand as Child Virginia
 Christian Vega as Child Mariano
 Mauro Navarro as Child Garabato
 Karim as Child Centavito
 Rogelio Hernández as Child Damián

Special participation 
 Claudio Báez as Ernesto Cantú
 Elizabeth Dupeyrón as Carolina
 Paloma Ruiz de Alda as Mónica Elizalde Castañeda
 Marcelo Córdoba as Javier Peñuela
 Luis Gatica as Fidel Gutiérrez
 África Zavala as Adult Leticia Martínez

Mexico broadcast 

La Gata premiered on May 5, 2014, and earned 17.7 points of rating in its 4 p.m. time slot. It was the third highest rated telenovela of the evening on Canal de las Estrellas. Univision started broadcasting La Gata in the United States on September 1, 2014 weeknights at 7pm/6c replacing De que te quiero, te quiero. The last episode was broadcast on February 13, 2015 with La sombra del pasado replacing it on February 16, 2015.

Awards and nominations

References

External links
 

Mexican telenovelas
2014 telenovelas
Televisa telenovelas
2014 Mexican television series debuts
Television shows set in Mexico City
Television shows set in New York City
2014 Mexican television series endings
Mexican television series based on Venezuelan television series
Spanish-language telenovelas